Speed limits in the United States are set by each state or territory. States have also allowed counties and municipalities to enact typically lower limits. Some states have lower limits for trucks, some also have night and/or minimum speed limits.

Portions of the Idaho, Montana, Nevada, Oklahoma, South Dakota, Texas, Utah, and Wyoming road networks have  posted limits.

During World War II, the U.S. Office of Defense Transportation established a national 35 mph "Victory Speed Limit" (also known as "War Speed") to conserve gasoline and rubber for the American war effort, from May 1942 to August 1945, when the war ended. For 13 years (January 1974–April 1987), federal law withheld Federal highway trust funds to states that had speed limits above .

Overview

Speed limits
This table contains the most usual posted daytime speed limits, in miles per hour, on typical roads in each category. The values shown are not necessarily the fastest or slowest. They usually indicate, but not always, statutory speed limits. Some states and territories have lower truck speed limits applicable to heavy trucks. If present, they are usually only on freeways or other high-speed roadways.

Examples of penalties

History
One of the first speed limits in what would become the United States (at the time, still a British colony) was set in Boston in 1701 by the board of selectmen (similar to a city council):Ordered, That no person whatsoever Shall at any time hereafter ride or drive a gallop or other extream pace within any of the Streets, lanes, or alleys in this Town on penalty of forfeiting three Shillings for every such offence, and it may be lawfull for any of the Inhabitants of this Town to make Stop of such horse or Rider  the name of the offender be known in order to prosecution

Federal speed controls

In response to the 1973 oil crisis, Congress enacted the National Maximum Speed Law that created the universal  speed limit. States had to agree to the limit if they desired to receive federal funding for highway repair. The federal government enforced the national maximum speed limit by withholding federal funding for projects whose speed limits exceeded . Federal highway funding is normally allocated according to 23 U.S. Code § 106, the National Maximum Speed Law (also known as H.R.11372 - An Act to conserve energy on the Nation's highways) modified the allocation process. As stated, in part:

In 1984, a comprehensive study by the National Research Council found that the lower speed limits contributed to saving 3,000 to 5,000 lives in 1974 and from 2,000 to 4,000 lives each year thereafter, due to slower and more uniform speeds on American highways.

1995 repeal

In 1995, the law was repealed by the National Highway System Designation Act of 1995, returning the choice of speed limit to each state.

Upon that repeal, there was effectively no speed limit on Montana's highways for daytime driving (the nighttime limit was set at ) from 1995 until 1999, when the state Supreme Court threw out the law requiring a "reasonable and prudent" speed as "unconstitutionally vague." The state legislature enacted a  daytime limit in May 1999. Overall, the new speed limit law in Montana was found to be satisfactory to residents of the state.

There are 8 states that have  speed limits.

There is mixed evidence of the 1995 repeal's effect on fatalities. On one hand, statistical records of motor vehicle fatalities indicate that total traffic deaths in the United States have declined from 41,817 that year to 32,479 in 2011, the lowest level in 60 years, before increasing to 37,133 in 2017.

On the other hand, the Insurance Institute for Highway Safety (IIHS) published a study in April 2019 that controlled for general time trends, the unemployment rate, percentage of young drivers, and safety belt use rate. The study concluded the increase of speed limits not only increases the speed of vehicles but can also generate additional deaths: "A 5 mph increase in the maximum state speed limit was associated with an 8.5% increase in fatality rates on interstates/freeways and a 2.8% increase on other roads."

Truck speed limits
Some jurisdictions set lower speed limits that are applicable only to large commercial vehicles like heavy trucks and buses. While they are called "truck speed limits", they generally do not apply to light trucks.

A 1987 study said that crash involvement significantly increases when trucks drive much slower than passenger vehicles, suggesting that the difference in speed between passenger vehicles and slower trucks could cause crashes that otherwise may not happen. In a review of available research, the Transportation Research Board said "[no] conclusive evidence could be found to support or reject the use of differential speed limits for passenger cars and heavy trucks" and "a strong case cannot be made on empirical grounds in support of or in opposition to differential speed limits". Another study said that two thirds (67%) of truck/passenger car crashes are the fault of the passenger vehicle.

Minimum speed limits and night speed limits

In addition to the legally defined maximum speed, minimum speed limits may be applicable. Occasionally there are default minimum speed limits for certain types of roads, generally freeways. Numeric night speed limits are occasionally used.

Political considerations

Financial concerns
Traffic violations can be a lucrative income source for jurisdictions and insurance companies. For example:
 The town of Westlake, Texas, took in $42,000 per citizen over nine years for its speed traps.
 Insurance companies may receive several billions of dollars annually in traffic ticket surcharges.
 A study by the Federal Reserve of St. Louis found that traffic ticket writing increases when government revenue decreases.
 2008 debates over traffic enforcement in Dallas County, Texas, involved concerns of lost profits if ticket writing decreased.
In Massachusetts, half of the ticket money goes to the police department that writes the speeding ticket, the other half goes to fund the court that convicts the speeder or collects the fine from them.

Thus, an authority that sets and enforces speed limits, such as a state government, regulates and taxes insurance companies, who also gain revenue from speeding enforcement. Furthermore, such an authority often requires "all" drivers to have policies with those same companies, solidifying the association between the state and auto insurers. If a driver cannot be covered under an insurance policy because of high risk, the state will assume that high risk for a greater monetary amount; thus resulting in even more revenue generation for the state.

When a speed limit is used to generate revenue but has no safety justification, it is called a speed trap. The town of New Rome, Ohio was such a speed trap, where speeding tickets raised up to $400,000 per year to fund the police department of a 12-acre village with 60 residents.

Environmental concerns
Reduced speed limits are sometimes enacted for air quality reasons. The most prominent example includes Texas' environmental speed limits.

Definition of speeding
Either of the following qualifies a crash as speed-related in accordance with U.S. government rules:
 Exceeding speed limits.
 Driving too fast for conditions.

Speeds in excess of speed limits account for most speed-related traffic citations; generally, "driving too fast for conditions" tickets are issued only after an incident where the ticket issuer found tangible evidence of unreasonable speed, such as a crash. Driving too fast for conditions is sometimes cited when a motorist is caught exceeding the posted speed limit, but the speed falls below a state's "default" speed limit codified in law. This makes it difficult for the motorist to get out of a ticket by claiming the speed at which he or she was travelling was within the state's legal speed limit, despite the lower posted speed limit for which the motorist may or may not have been aware of.

A criticism of the "exceeding speed limits" definition of speeding is twofold:
 When speed limits are arbitrary, such as when set through political rather than empirical processes, the speed limit's relationship to the maximum safe speed is weakened or intentionally eliminated. Therefore, a crash can be counted as speed-related even if it occurs at a safe speed, simply because the speed was in excess of a politically determined limit.
 The effective limit may still be too fast for certain conditions, such as limited visibility or reduced road traction or even low-speed truck rollovers on exit ramps.

Variable speed limits offer some potential to reduce speed-related crashes. However, due to the high cost of implementation, they exist primarily on freeways. Furthermore, most speed-related crashes occur on local and collector roads, which generally have far lower speed limits and prevailing speeds than freeways.

Prima facie
Most states have absolute speed limits, meaning that a speed in excess of the limit is illegal per se. However, some states have prima facie speed limits. This allows motorists to defend against a speeding charge if it can be proven that the speed was in fact reasonable and prudent.

Speed limits in various states, including Texas, Utah, Massachusetts, New Hampshire, Connecticut, Ohio, Oregon, and Rhode Island are prima facie. Some other states have a hybrid system: speed limits may be prima facie up to a certain speed or only on certain roads. For example, speed limits in California up to 55 mph, or 65 mph on highways, are prima facie, and those at or above those speeds are absolute.

A successful prima facie defense is rare. Not only does the burden of proof rest upon the accused, a successful defense may involve expenses well in excess of the cost of a ticket, such as an expert witness. Furthermore, because prima facie defenses must be presented in a court, such a defense is difficult for out-of-town motorists.

Metric speed limits

Metric speed limits are no longer included in the Federal Highway Administration's Manual on Uniform Traffic Control Devices (MUTCD), which provides guidelines for speed limit signage, and therefore, new installations are not legal in the United States. Prior to 2009, a speed limit could be defined in kilometers per hour (km/h) as well as miles per hour (mph). The 2003 version of the MUTCD stated that "speed limits shown shall be in multiples of 10 km/h or 5 mph." If a speed limit sign indicated km/h, the number was circumscribed and "km/h" was written below. Prior to 2003, metric speed limits were designated using the standard speed limit sign, usually with yellow supplemental "METRIC" and "km/h" plaques above it and below it, respectively.

In 1995, the National Highway System Designation Act prohibited use of federal funds to finance new metric signage.

See also
 Driver License Compact
 Non-Resident Violator Compact
 Solomon curve
 Traffic violations reciprocity
 Transportation safety in the United States
 Traffic code in the United States

Notes

References

Law review
 
 

Road transportation in the United States
United States
United States transportation law